An Jong Deok (born 1972) is a South Korean voice actor.

He joined the MBC's voice acting division in 1994.

Roles

Broadcast TV
 Hwaje JipJoong (Narration, MBC)
 Futari wa Pretty Cure (Korea TV Edition, SBS)
 Mega Ranger (Power Rangers, Korea TV Edition, SBS)
 Iron Leaguer (Korea TV Edition, SBS)
 Beast Wars (Korea TV Edition, SBS)
 Slam Dunk (Korea TV Edition, SBS)
 Olympus Guardian (SBS)
 Beyblade (Top Blade, Korea TV Edition, SBS)
 Tennis of King (Korea TV Edition, SBS)
 Power Force Ranger (Power Rangers, Korea TV Edition, SBS)

See also
 Munhwa Broadcasting Corporation
 MBC Voice Acting Division

External links
 MBC Voice Acting Division An Jong Deok Blog (in Korean)
 Ad Sound An Jong Deok Blog (in Korean)

Living people
South Korean male voice actors
1972 births